"Let Them Know" is a song by English singer Mabel. It was released by Polydor Records on 18 June 2021 as the lead single from her second studio album About Last Night... (2022). The song was written by Mabel, Raye, MNEK, and its producer SG Lewis.

Music and lyrics
"Let Them Know" is an uptempo, dance-pop, synth-pop and 1980s-style disco song with dancehall undertones. It is 2 minutes and 28 seconds long, and has a 1990s house rhythm reminiscent of RuPaul's 1992 song "Supermodel (You Better Work)".

Inspired by obsessively watching 1990 film Paris Is Burning, and American television series Pose and RuPaul's Drag Race, Mabel wrote the track as a reflection on dance music's generational themes of expression, liberation and inclusion. According to the singer, "Let Them Know" is "dedicated to anyone who's ever felt scared to truly be themselves." The lyrics include a reference to Doja Cat and her 2020 song "Say So".

Release
Mabel first teased the single's release on 9 June 2021 with a 30-second teaser trailer titled "Allow Me to Reintroduce Myself". The clip shows the singer performing and filming a music video, and ends with a preview of "Let Them Know". On 10 June, she shared the release date, cover art and a link to pre-save the single on streaming services. The official TikTok audio was released on 12 June. Within a week, more than 52,000 videos were uploaded under the audio by users of the social networking service.

"Let Them Know" was released by Polydor Records on 18 June. It was promoted with its own lens filter on Instagram and Snapchat, and added it to rotation by British radio stations BBC Radio 1 and Capital FM 
the same day. A remix by English DJ Riton was released on 9 July.

Critical response
In his review for The Sunday Times, Dan Cairns likened the track to music by the Spice Girls, describing it as "sassy, savvy, precision-tooled pop perfection". Isaac Chiew of NME regarded the "bombastic floor-filler" as a welcome comeback from Mabel, complimenting its disco production and "anthemic" chorus. Clash reviewer Robin Murray called it "an unashamed addition to the pop banger canon." The Guardians Luke Holland viewed the song as "wholly edgeless yet undeniably enjoyable glitter-pop" and "daft fun in all the ways pop should be".

Commercial performance
"Let Them Know" debuted at number 38 on the UK Singles Chart with first-week sales of 10,368 units. It has since ascended to a new peak of number 19 on the chart dated August 26, 2021. In Ireland, the song entered the Irish Singles Chart at number 48; it has peaked at number 19.

Music video
The music video for "Let Them Know" was directed by Isaac Rentz. A 25-second teaser trailer was shared on Mabel's YouTube channel on 16 June 2021. The music video live premiered on YouTube at 8 a.m. BST on 18 June, preceded by a live chat with the singer. A behind the scenes segment was released by MTV UK on 28 June.

Track listing
Digital download and streaming
 "Let Them Know" – 2:28

Digital download and streaming – Riton remix
 "Let Them Know" (Riton Remix) – 3:00

Personnel
Credits adapted from Qobuz.
 Mabel – vocals, background vocals
 SG Lewis – producer, drums, engineer, keyboards, bass, synthesizer, programming
 Raye – co-producer, vocal producer
 Cameron Gower Poole – vocal producer
 Josh Gudwin – mixing
 Heidi Wang – mixing assistance
 Stuart Hawkes – mastering

Charts

Certifications

Release history

References

2021 singles
2021 songs
Mabel (singer) songs
Dance-pop songs
Disco songs
Polydor Records singles
Song recordings produced by SG Lewis
Songs written by Mabel (singer)
Songs written by MNEK
Songs written by Raye (singer)
Songs written by SG Lewis